John "Buster" Fitzgerald was an American baseball catcher in the Negro leagues. He played with the Newark Eagles in 1943 and 1947 and the New York Black Yankees in 1947.

References

External links
 and Seamheads

Newark Eagles players
New York Black Yankees players
Year of birth missing
Year of death missing
Baseball players from Newark, New Jersey
Baseball catchers